The 227th Tallinn Order of Suvorov Red Star Artillery Brigade is a formation of the Russian Ground Forces. It is part of the 49th Combined Arms Army.

The Brigade was formed in 2017 on the basis of the 943th Rocket Artillery Regiment. The brigade is equipped with the Msta-B howitzer and the BM-27 Uragan. The unit has participated in the 2022 Russian invasion of Ukraine and has suffered the loss of many senior staff including the brigade commander, Lieutenant Colonel Vyacheslav Savinov in March 2022.

References 

Artillery brigades of the Russian Federation
Military units and formations established in the 2010s